Bryant is a census-designated place (CDP) in Snohomish County, Washington, United States. The population was 1,870 at the 2010 census.

A post office called Bryant was established in 1893, and remained in operation until 1954. The community most likely took its name from the Bryant Lumber and Shingle Company.

Geography 
Bryant is located at  (48.248420, -122.174430).

According to the United States Census Bureau, the CDP has a total area of 6.175 square miles (15.99 km), of which, 6.141 square miles (15.91 km) of it is land and 0.034 square miles (0.09 km) of it (0.55%) is water.

References 

Census-designated places in Washington (state)
Census-designated places in Snohomish County, Washington